Pakkiam Vaikundam Arulanandam Mohandas is an Indian orthopedic surgeon from Chennai, Tamil Nadu. He is the founder and the managing director of Madras Institute of Orthopaedics and Traumatology, known as MIOT Hospital. He is a former assistant professor of Orthopedics at Stanley Medical College and former professor at Madras Medical College and Kilpauk Medical College, three of the known medical institutions in Chennai. The Government of India awarded him the fourth highest civilian honour of the Padma Shri in 1992. He is married to Mallika who is the chairman of the MIOT Hospitals.

References

External links 
 
 
 

Recipients of the Padma Shri in medicine
Medical doctors from Chennai
Indian orthopedic surgeons
Indian medical academics
20th-century Indian medical doctors
20th-century surgeons